Architectural office may refer to:

 An architectural firm
 The predecessor of the Architectural Services Department of the Hong Kong government